Dehdaran-e Sofla (also Romanized as  Dehdārān-e Soflá and Dehdaran Sofla; also known as Dehdārān and Dehdārān-e Pā’īn) is a village in Shabankareh Rural District, Shabankareh District, Dashtestan County, Bushehr Province, Iran. At the 2006 census, its population was 1,767, in 350 families.

References 

Populated places in Dashtestan County